Galina Efremenko ( Maniachenko (: Halyna Yefremenko (Manyachenko); born 23 December 1980) is a Ukrainian former competitive figure skater. She competed as Galina Maniachenko from 1993 until 2005 when she began competing under her married name, Efremenko. She won the bronze medal at the 2003 Cup of Russia, gold medals at the 2000 Nebelhorn Trophy, 2003 Karl Schäfer Memorial, 2000 and 2003 Ondrej Nepela Memorial, and three Ukrainian national titles. She competed twice at the Winter Olympics, placing 12th in 2002. Her highest placement at the European Championships was 4th in 2002.

Career 
For most of her career, she competed under her birth name, Galina Maniachenko. In the early 1990s, she competed in pair skating with Evgeni Zhigurski, coached by Nina Mozer. The pair won the bronze medal at the 1994 World Junior Championships. However, in 1995 she was severely injured after her partner's blade hit her face while they were practicing side-by-side camel spins. Maniachenko retired from skating but after a year and a half she decided to return to competition as a singles skater.

Maniachenko won the Ukrainian national title three times and competed at two Olympics (2002, 2006). She won gold medals at Nebelhorn Trophy, Karl Schäfer Memorial, Ondrej Nepela Memorial, and silver medals at the Winter Universiade and Golden Spin of Zagreb. Maniachenko won a Grand Prix bronze medal at 2003 Cup of Russia. At the European Championships, she finished as high as fourth in 2002. In 2005, she began competing as Galina Efremenko. She had a number of injuries towards the end of her career. After competing at her second Olympics, she decided to retire from competition.

Personal life 
In the summer of 2005, she married pentathlete Mikhail Efremenko and took his name. By marriage, she is related to fellow skater Elena Liashenko who married her husband's brother, Andrei Efremenko. After retiring from competition, she began coaching in Latvia and gave birth to a daughter in 2007. Her daughter's godmother is Aliona Savchenko.

Programs

Competitive highlights

Singles career

Pairs career 
(with Evgeni Zhigurski)

References

External links 

 

1980 births
Living people
Sportspeople from Kyiv
Ukrainian female single skaters
Ukrainian female pair skaters
Figure skaters at the 2002 Winter Olympics
Figure skaters at the 2006 Winter Olympics
Olympic figure skaters of Ukraine
World Junior Figure Skating Championships medalists
Universiade medalists in figure skating
Universiade silver medalists for Ukraine
Competitors at the 1999 Winter Universiade
Competitors at the 2005 Winter Universiade